The Politics of Anhui Province in the People's Republic of China is structured in a dual party-government system like all other governing institutions in mainland China.

The Governor of Anhui (安徽省省长) is the highest-ranking official in the People's Government of Anhui. However, in the province's dual party-government governing system, the Governor has less power than the Anhui Chinese Communist Party Provincial Committee Secretary (安徽省委书记), colloquially termed the "Anhui Party Chief".

List of provincial-level leaders

Chinese Communist Party secretaries 
Zeng Xisheng (曾希圣): 1952-1962
Li Baohua (李葆华): 1962-1967
Li Desheng (李德生): 1969-1974　
Song Peizhang (宋佩璋): 1975-1977
Wan Li (万里): 1977-1980　
Zhang Jingfu (张劲夫): 1980-1982　
Zhou Zijian (周子健): 1982-1983　
Huang Huang (黄璜): 1983-1986　
Li Guixian (李贵鲜): 1986-1988
Lu Rongjing (卢荣景): 1988-1998　
Hui Liangyu (回良玉): 1998-2000　
Wang Taihua (王太华): 2000-2004
Guo Jinlong (郭金龙): 2004-2007
Wang Jinshan (王金山): 2007-2010
Zhang Baoshun (张宝顺): 2010-2015
Wang Xuejun (王学军): 2015-2016
Li Jinbin (李锦斌): 2016-2021
Zheng Shanjie(郑栅洁): 2021-present

Chairpersons of Anhui People's Congress 
Gu Zhouxin (顾卓新): 1979-1983
Yang Weiping (杨蔚屏): 1983-1985
Wang Guangyu (王光宇): 1985-1993
Meng Fulin (孟富林): 1993-2003
Wang Taihua (王太华): 2003-2004
Guo Jinlong (郭金龙): 2005-2008
Wang Jinshan (王金山): 2008-2010
Zhang Baoshun (张宝顺): 2010-2015
Wang Xuejun (王学军): 2015-2016
Li Jinbin (李锦斌): 2016-2022
Zheng Shanjie(郑栅洁): 2022-present

Governors 
Zeng Xisheng (曾希圣): 1952-1955 　
Huang Yan (黄岩): 1955-1967
Li Desheng (李德生): 1968-1974 (Chairman of the Revolutionary Committee)　
Song Peizhang (宋佩璋): 1975-1978 (Chairman of the Revolutionary Committee)　
Wan Li (万里): 1978-1979 　
Zhang Jingfu (张劲夫): 1979-1981
Zhou Zijian (周子健): 1981-1983
Wang Yuzhao (王郁昭): 1983-1987　
Lu Rongjing (卢荣景): 1987-1989　
Fu Xishou (傅锡寿): 1989-1994　
Hui Liangyu (回良玉): 1994-1998　
Wang Taihua (王太华): 1998-2000　
Xu Zhonglin (许仲林): 2000-2002　
Wang Jinshan (王金山): 2002-2007
Wang Sanyun (王三运): 2007-2011
Li Bin (李斌): 2011-2013
Wang Xuejun (王学军): 2013-2015
Li Jinbin (李锦斌): 2015-2016
Li Guoying (李国英): 2016-2021
Wang Qingxian (王清宪): 2021-incumbent

Chairpersons of CPPCC Anhui Committee 
Zeng Xisheng (曾希圣): 1955-1962　
Li Baohua (李葆华): 1962-1967　
Gu Zhuoxin (顾卓新): 1978-1979
Zhang Kaifan (张凯帆): 1979-1984　
Yang Haibo (杨海波): 1984-1985
Shi Junjie (史钧杰): 1985-1996
Lu Rongjing (卢荣景): 1996-2000
Fang Zhaoxiang (方兆祥): 2000-2007
Yang Duoliang (杨多良): 2007-2011
Wang Mingfang (王明方): 2011-2017
Xu Liquan (徐立全): 2017–2018
Zhang Chang'er (张昌尔): 2018–2021
Tang Liangzhi (唐良智): 2021-present

References 

Anhui

Anhui